Larkspur is a summer village in Alberta, Canada. It is located north of Westlock and south of Athabasca, east of Highway 44 and west of Highway 2.

Demographics 

In the 2016 Census of Population conducted by Statistics Canada, the Summer Village of Larkspur had a population of 44 living in 23 of its 89 total private dwellings, a  change from its 2011 population of 38.

See also 
List of communities in Alberta
List of summer villages in Alberta
List of resort villages in Saskatchewan

References

External links 

1985 establishments in Alberta
Summer villages in Alberta